Jerzy Strzałka (28 March 1933 – 13 October 1976) was a Polish fencer. He competed in the team épée event at the 1960 Summer Olympics.

References

1933 births
1976 deaths
Polish male fencers
Olympic fencers of Poland
Fencers at the 1960 Summer Olympics
People from Lublin County
Sportspeople from Lublin Voivodeship